The Troy Trojans were a Major League Baseball team in the National League for four seasons from 1879 to 1882. Their home games were played at Putnam Grounds (1879) and Haymakers' Grounds (1880–1881) in the upstate New York city of Troy, and at Troy Ball Clubs Grounds (1882) across the Hudson in Watervliet, or "West Troy" as it was known at the time.

The first Grand Slam home run in Major League history was hit by Roger Connor of this franchise in 1881 in East Albany (now known as Rensselaer) in what is now the Rensselaer Riverfront Park. The site in present day Rensselaer was infrequently used to host games when their normal field was unavailable. A baseball diamond in the park is currently in use very close to where the diamond would have been back in the 1880s. The site of the historic grand slam was only recently discovered as it was previously assumed to have occurred in eastern Albany. Overall, the franchise won 131 games and lost 194. The Trojans, along with the Worcester NL team, were expelled from the league shortly before the end of the 1882 season, as Troy and Worcester were seen as too small for the league's ambitions, but were encouraged to play out the rest of their seasons as lame-duck teams.

On September 28, 1882, only six fans appeared to watch Worcester host the Trojans in the second-to-last game of the season, then only 25 arrived for the last game between the two teams. Among games that have had at least one paying attendee, the attendance figure of six is the lowest attendance ever recorded at a Major League baseball game. In 1883 the New York Gothams, later known as the Giants, took the Trojans' former slot in the National League. Four of the original Gotham players were former members of the disbanded Trojans, including three Hall of Famers: Buck Ewing, Roger Connor and Mickey Welch.

A previous team named the Union Base Ball Club of Lansingburgh was organized in 1860, the successor to the Victories of Troy, and was a member of the National Association of Base Ball Players.  That team was given the nickname Haymakers by a defeated New York City team.

Notable players for the Trojans included Hall of Famers Dan Brouthers, Connor, Ewing, Tim Keefe, and Welch.

Another Troy Trojans minor league team continued play until at least 1916.

Baseball Hall of Famers

See also
 1879 Troy Trojans season
 1880 Troy Trojans season
 1881 Troy Trojans season
 1882 Troy Trojans season
 Troy Trojans all-time roster

References

External links
 Baseball-Reference.com

Defunct Major League Baseball teams
Troy, New York
Sports in Rensselaer County, New York
Defunct baseball teams in New York (state)
Baseball teams disestablished in 1882
Baseball teams established in 1879